Eudonia colpota is a moth in the family Crambidae. It was described by Edward Meyrick in 1888. It is endemic to New Zealand.

The wingspan is 17–18 mm. The forewings are ochreous-brown in the basal three-fifths, and the terminal two-fifths is light-grey. The hindwings are very pale whitish-grey, with a darker grey postmedian line and hindmargin. Adults have been recorded on wing in January.

References

Moths described in 1888
Eudonia
Moths of New Zealand
Endemic fauna of New Zealand
Taxa named by Edward Meyrick
Endemic moths of New Zealand